The office of President of Egypt was established in 1953. The president is the head of state of Egypt and the Supreme Commander of the Egyptian Armed Forces. The current president is Abdel Fattah el-Sisi, who has effectively controlled the country since the 2013 coup d'état, and was officially elected president in 2014.

Background
The first president of Egypt was Mohamed Naguib, one of the leaders of the Free Officers Movement who led the Egyptian Revolution of 1952, and who took office on 18 June 1953, the day on which Egypt was declared a republic. Since then the office has been held by five further people: Gamal Abdel Nasser, Anwar Sadat, Hosni Mubarak, Mohamed Morsi and Abdel Fattah el-Sisi. In addition, Sufi Abu Taleb acted as president between Sadat's assassination and the election of his successor, and Adly Mansour acted as president after Morsi's overthrow in the 2013 coup d'état.

Following Hosni Mubarak's resignation on 11 February 2011 in the Egyptian Revolution of 2011, the office was vacant, with the functions of head of state and head of government being discharged by the chairman of the Supreme Council of the Armed Forces, Field Marshal Mohamed Hussein Tantawi.

Mohamed Morsi took office on 30 June 2012, after being elected by the presidential election held on 23–24 May and 16–17 June 2012. He was deposed by the Egyptian Armed Forces in a coup d'état on 3 July 2013, following massive protests calling for his resignation. He was succeeded by Adly Mansour, the head of the Supreme Constitutional Court of Egypt, as Acting President. Mansour was sworn into office in front of the Supreme Constitutional Court on 4 July 2013.

Current President el-Sisi took office on 8 June 2014, after being elected by the presidential election held on 26–28 May 2014. He was re-elected by the presidential election held on 26–28 March 2018.

List of officeholders

Timeline

See also
President of Egypt
List of presidents of Egypt by time in office
Vice-President of Egypt
Prime Minister of Egypt
List of prime ministers of Egypt
Speaker of the House of Representatives (Egypt)
List of speakers of the House of Representatives (Egypt)

Notes

References

Citations

Sources

 
 

Presidents
Egypt
 
presidents
1953 establishments in Egypt